The 1991 NAIA Division I football season was the 36th season of college football sponsored by the NAIA, was the 22nd season of play of the NAIA's top division for football.

The season was played from August to November 1991 and culminated in the 1991 NAIA Champion Bowl playoffs and the 1991 NAIA Champion Bowl, played this year on December 14, 1991 at McPherson Stadium in Wilberforce, Ohio, on the campus of Central State University.

Central Arkansas defeated Central State (OH), the defending national champions, in the Champion Bowl, 19–16, to win their third NAIA national title. It was the Bears' first non-shared national title.

Conference changes
 This is the final season that the NAIA officially recognizes a football champion from the South Atlantic Conference. The SAC, and its eight members, would become an NCAA Division II conference by the 1993 season.

Conference standings

Conference champions

Postseason

See also
 1991 NCAA Division I-A football season
 1991 NCAA Division I-AA football season
 1991 NCAA Division II football season
 1991 NCAA Division III football season

References

 
NAIA Football National Championship